Patrick Stephen Murphy (13 May 1889 – 1 May 1968) was an Irish politician and solicitor. He was elected to Dáil Éireann as a Fianna Fáil Teachta Dála (TD) for the Cork East constituency at the 1932 general election. He was re-elected at the 1933 general election but lost his seat at the 1937 general election.

References

1889 births
1968 deaths
Fianna Fáil TDs
Members of the 7th Dáil
Members of the 8th Dáil
Irish solicitors
Politicians from County Cork